Stefan Kazimierz Charbicki (died 8 June 1663) was a Roman Catholic prelate who served as Auxiliary Bishop of Lviv (1657–1663) and Titular Bishop of  Nicopolis in Epiro (1657–1663).

Biography
On 19 January 1657, Stefan Stefan Kazimierz Charbicki was appointed during the papacy of Pope Alexander VII as Auxiliary Bishop of Lviv and Titular Bishop of  Nicopolis in Epiro. He served as Auxiliary Bishop of Lviv until his death in 1663. While bishop, he was the principal co-consecrator of Gaspar Trizenieski, Auxiliary Bishop of Gniezno (1661).

See also 
Catholic Church in Ukraine

References

External links and additional sources
 (for Chronology of Bishops) 
 (for Chronology of Bishops)  
 (for Chronology of Bishops) 

17th-century Roman Catholic bishops in the Polish–Lithuanian Commonwealth
Bishops appointed by Pope Alexander VII
1663 deaths